Halkapınar Transfer Center, commonly referred to as Halkapınar Metro or just Halkapınar, is a multi-modal transportation complex in İzmir, Turkey. Located in northeast Konak, it is the largest transportation complex in İzmir, as well as the Aegean Region. The complex offers connections between İZBAN commuter rail service, İzmir Metro rapid transit service, Tram İzmir tram service and ESHOT city bus service. Halkapınar Transfer Center was originally opened in 1865 as a railway station. The transfer center opened on 22 May 2000 together with a new metro station and bus terminals and was the first complex to offer direct connection between heavy rail and rapid transit service in Turkey.

History

The oldest part of Halkapınar Transfer Center is the railway station. Originally built by the Smyrna Cassaba Railway (SCP), Halkapınar railway station opened on 20 July 1865 along with the railway from Basmane to Karşıyaka and Bornova. Halkapınar station was located just before the Bornova line diverged off the mainline to Karşıyaka and later Afyon. The SCP was bought by the Turkish State Railways in 1934, which continued to operate commuter trains that stopped at Halkapınar.

In a plan to improve rail service around İzmir, the city municipality began planning a commuter rail and rapid transit network. Halkapınar was designated to become the primary transfer point between the two systems. In 1994, the State Railways sold the Bornova Branch to the city of İzmir, which began construction of the İzmir Metro along its right-of-way. Construction of the İzmir Metro saw the addition of two new platforms and a maintenance facility at Halkapınar. The new facilities were completed in 1999 and Halkapınar Transfer Center officially opened on 22 May 2000. In anticipation for expanded commuter service to Aliağa, Halkapınar station was electrified with overhead wire. The station was electrified in 2001, but never used. In 2006, plans for a new commuter railsystem, İZBAN, were finalized and the rehabilitation of the railway began. Between 2006 and 2010 Halkapınar saw a suspension of heavy rail trains, due to the construction of railway tunnels in Şirinyer and Karşıyaka. Service returned on 5 December 2010, with the inauguration of the Northern Line to Çiğli.

Ever since İZBAN began operating, Halkapınar has become the busiest station in İzmir and one of the busiest stations in Turkey. In order to accommodate the thousands of daily passengers, a second overpass was built to the east of the existing one in 2013. In 2016, Halkapınar saw a total of over 24 million boardings.

Layout

Halkapınar has a total of five island platforms serving nine tracks, three for metro and four for heavy rail in the main complex and two in the tram stop. The two platforms on the southern side are for İzmir Metro trains on the Fahrettin Altay—Evka 3 Line. Out of the other two platforms, the south platform (adjacent to the İzmir Metro platforms), is for İZBAN commuter trains, while the fourth platform is currently used for parking the freight stock. Prior to 2016, that platform was used by intercity and regional trains to Eskişehir, Balıkesir, Bandırma, Uşak and Konya.

On both sides of the platforms are railyards. On the north side is a small freight yard, used by TCDD Taşımacılık, for freight trains using the nearby Port of İzmir. On the south side is the İzmir Metro's Halkapınar Maintenance Facility, used for layovers and maintenance of their rolling stock. A new depot for Tram İzmir equipment has been built, next to the metro depot. Further south of the under construction tram depot is a bus garage, used by ESHOT, for their city bus fleet.

City buses arrive and depart from two separate bus terminals, located on opposite sides of the complex. The larger bus terminal, with 9 bus bays and 17 halts, is located to the southwest, accessible via Şehitler Avenue. The majority of buses depart from this terminal. The second and smaller one, with 6 bus bays and 8 halts, is located on the north side of the complex and is accessible via 1561st Street. Both terminals are accessible via the main overpass, connecting all facilities of the transfer center.

The tram station for the Konak Tram is located on the southern side of the complex, along Şehitler Avenue. It is accessible via a walkway.

Bus Connections
ESHOT
 102 Halkapınar Metro-Alpaslan
 168 Halkapınar Metro-Evka 4 via Osmangazi
 253 Halkapınar Metro-Konak via Talatpaşa Avenue
 501 Halkapınar Metro-Çiçek Mahallesi
 502 Halkapınar Metro-Cengizhan
 503 Halkapınar Metro-Barış Kahvesi
 504 Halkapınar Metro-F. Edip Baksı
 543 Halkapınar Metro-Bostanlı Transfer Station
 555 Halkapınar Metro-İZOTAŞ
 560 Halkapınar Metro-Pınarbaşı
 599 Halkapınar Metro-Borsa Okulu

Gallery

Notes

References

Transfer Centers in Turkey
Railway stations in İzmir Province
Railway stations opened in 1865
1865 establishments in the Ottoman Empire
Railway stations closed in 2006
Konak District
İzmir Metro
Proposed rapid transit stations in Turkey